In enzymology, an aminobutyraldehyde dehydrogenase is an enzyme that catalyzes the chemical reaction

4-aminobutanal + NAD+ + H2O  4-aminobutanoate + NADH + 2 H+

The 3 substrates of this enzyme are 4-aminobutanal, NAD+, and H2O, whereas its 3 products are 4-aminobutanoate, NADH, and H+.

This enzyme belongs to the family of oxidoreductases, specifically those acting on the aldehyde or oxo group of donor with NAD+ or NADP+ as acceptor.  The systematic name of this enzyme class is 4-aminobutanal:NAD+ 1-oxidoreductase. Other names in common use include gamma-guanidinobutyraldehyde dehydrogenase (ambiguous), ABAL dehydrogenase, 4-aminobutyraldehyde dehydrogenase, 4-aminobutanal dehydrogenase, gamma-aminobutyraldehyde dehydrogenase, 1-pyrroline dehydrogenase, ABALDH, and YdcW.  This enzyme participates in the urea cycle and the metabolism of amino groups and beta-alanine.

References

 
 
 
 
 
 
 
 

EC 1.2.1
NADH-dependent enzymes
Enzymes of unknown structure